Hoddesdon Cemetery is the burial ground for the town of Hoddesdon in Hertfordshire in the UK and is owned and maintained by the Borough of Broxbourne.

Located on Ware Road in Hoddesdon, the first interment was in February 1883 since when over 11,000 burials have taken place in the cemetery. Among these are nine casualties from World War I and 15 from World War II in plots maintained by the Commonwealth War Graves Commission. The small cemetery chapel is still in use and is usually open during daytime.

Notable burials

 Lena Zavaroni (1963–1999), Scottish singer and television show host.

Gallery

References

External links

 

Hoddesdon
Commonwealth War Graves Commission cemeteries in England
Cemeteries in Hertfordshire